Riverside is an area in the city of Norwich in the English county of Norfolk along the east bank of the River Wensum. Very close to the Central Business District, it lies between the river and the Great Eastern Main Line, with Norwich station at the northern end and Norwich City's Carrow Road stadium at the southern end.

The area was historically an industrial area with the river being Norwich's link to the coast. Companies such as engineering firm Boulton & Paul developed on the site. The engineering works closed in the late 1980s leaving the site largely derelict. For much of the 1990s it was mainly used as a park and ride car park for Norwich.

In 1994, Norwich City Council, along with private stakeholders, presented the first development plans for the area. The first phases of the redevelopment opened in 1999. This has seen the area developed as a mixed use site with a combination of leisure, retailing and residential land use. This includes a major supermarket, a multiscreen cinema, a bowling alley and a swimming pool. Much of the entertainment landuse on the site is owned by X-Leisure, who own a number of similar sites across the country including the Xscape brand.

External links
 X-Leisure company site

Areas of Norwich